Samuel Forest Plummer (May 28, 1853 – November 5, 1926) was a member of the Wisconsin State Assembly.

Biography
Plummer was born on May 28, 1853 in Clarence, Wisconsin. His father, Samuel L. Plummer, and brother, William Edmunds Plummer, were also members of the Assembly.

Career
Plummer was elected to the Assembly in 1896. Other positions he held include county surveyor of Pepin County, Wisconsin and justice of the peace. He was a Republican.

References

External links
 
Wisconsin Genealogy Trails

People from Spring Grove, Wisconsin
County officials in Wisconsin
Republican Party members of the Wisconsin State Assembly
American surveyors
American justices of the peace
1853 births
1926 deaths